Curtley Louw (born 2 January 1995) is a South African cricketer. He made his Twenty20 debut for Boland in the 2017 Africa T20 Cup on 15 September 2017. He made his first-class debut for Boland in the 2017–18 Sunfoil 3-Day Cup on 26 October 2017. He made his List A debut for Boland in the 2017–18 CSA Provincial One-Day Challenge on 29 October 2017.

References

External links
 

1995 births
Living people
South African cricketers
Boland cricketers
Place of birth missing (living people)